Adolph Modéer (15 April 173916 July 1799) was a Swedish surveyor, economic historian and naturalist.

Biography
Modéer  was born at Karlskrona, Sweden.
He became a student at Lund University in 1754.

Modéer worked as a surveyor from 1755, and was Secretary of the Medical Society at Stockholm and from 1786 a member of the Royal Swedish Academy of Sciences.
As a naturalist he was mainly interested in malacology and entomology. He also worked on jellyfish. As an economic historian, he wrote on the history of Sweden's trade.

Selected  works
 Någre märkvärdigheter hos insectet Cimex ovatus pallide-griseus, abdominis lateribus albo nigroque variis, alis albis, basi scutelli nigricante. - Kongliga Vetenskaps Academiens Handlingar 25 (1-3): 41-47, Tab. II [= 2]. Stockholm. (1764).
 Bibliotheca helminthologica, seu Enumeratio auctorum qui de vermibus scilicet eryptozois, gymnodelis, testaceis atque phytozoois tam vivis quam petrificatis scripserunt edita ab Adolpho Modeer (J.J. Palmium, Erlangen, 1786).
 Styng-Flug-Slägtet (Oestrus). - Kongliga Vetenskaps Academiens Nya Handlingar 7 (4-6, 7-9): 125-158, 180-185. Stockholm (1786).
 Slägtet Pipmask, Tubipora. - Kongliga Vetenskaps Academiens Nya Handlingar 9 (7-9): 219-239, 241-251, Tab. VII [= 7]. Stockholm (1788).
 Om Slägtet Trumpetmask, Triton. - Kongliga Vetenskaps Academiens Nya Handlingar 10 (1-3): 52-56, Tab. II [= 2]. Stockholm (1789).

References

1739 births
1799 deaths
People from Karlskrona
Lund University alumni
Swedish economists
Swedish entomologists
Swedish malacologists
Members of the Royal Swedish Academy of Sciences